Ezio Moroni (born 25 December 1961) is an Italian former professional road cyclist. In his career, he notably won the Giro dell'Emilia in 1984, the GP Industria & Commercio di Prato and the Giro di Toscana in 1985, as well as the Giro di Romagna in 1987. He also competed in three editions of the Giro d'Italia.

Major results

1979
 7th Road race, UCI Junior Road World Championships
1982
 1st Trofeo Gianfranco Bianchin
1983
 1st Giro d'Oro
 1st GP Palio del Recioto
 1st Stage 2 Giro Ciclistico d'Italia
 1st Stages 4a & 6 Settimana Ciclistica Lombarda
 1st Stage 1 Giro delle Regioni
1984
 1st Giro dell'Emilia
 1st Stage 4 Settimana Ciclistica Lombarda
 2nd Giro del Veneto
1985
 1st Giro di Toscana
 1st GP Industria & Commercio di Prato
 5th Coppa Sabatini
 6th Overall Settimana Internazionale Coppi e Bartali
 7th Gran Premio Città di Camaiore
1986
 3rd Giro del Veneto
 6th Nice–Alassio
 9th Giro dell'Etna
1987
 1st Giro di Romagna
 3rd Overall Giro di Puglia
 7th Trofeo Laigueglia
 8th Overall Giro del Trentino

References

External links

1961 births
Living people
Italian male cyclists
Cyclists from Varese